Eugene Edward Paulette (May 26, 1891 – February 8, 1966) was a Major League Baseball infielder from 1911 to 1920.

Paulette broke in briefly with the New York Giants in 1911; but from 1912 to 1916, he played in the Southern Association.

He made it back to the majors with the St. Louis Browns in 1916. The following season, he was selected off waivers by the St. Louis Cardinals and became their regular first baseman. Paulette was versatile on the field; he played every infield position for the Cardinals in 1918. In July 1919, he was traded to the Philadelphia Phillies. He played a career-high 143 games for them in 1920.

However, in the wake of the Black Sox Scandal, Paulette was permanently suspended from organized baseball. He had allegedly received gifts from St. Louis gamblers and also offered to throw some games early in the 1919 season.

In 500 games over six seasons, Paulette posted a .269 batting average (478-for-1780) with 160 runs, 2 home runs, 165 RBI, 43 stolen bases and 108 bases on balls. Defensively, he recorded an overall .984 fielding percentage.

See also
 List of people banned from Major League Baseball

References

External links

1891 births
1966 deaths
Major League Baseball infielders
New York Giants (NL) players
St. Louis Browns players
St. Louis Cardinals players
Philadelphia Phillies players
Baseball players from Illinois
Mobile Sea Gulls players
Nashville Vols players
Cleveland Bearcats players
Memphis Chickasaws players